Kalanchoe pumila, the flower dust plant, is a species of flowering plant in the stonecrop family Crassulaceae, native to Madagascar.

The Latin specific epithet pumila means dwarf or low-growing.

This plant has gained the Royal Horticultural Society's Award of Garden Merit.

References

pumila
Taxa named by John Gilbert Baker